N55 may refer to:

Bus routes 
 N55 (Long Island bus)
 London Buses route N55

Roads 
 N55 road (Ireland)
 Indus Highway, in Pakistan
 Romulo Highway, in the Philippines

Other uses 
 BMW N55, an automobile engine 
 , a submarine of the Royal Navy
 Jaluit Airport, on Jaluit Atoll, Marshall Islands
 Nikon N55, a camera